Iqbal Hossain Apu is a member of the Bangladesh Awami League's central Executive committee and is the current member of parliament from Shariatpur-1. He is vice chairman for board of trustees in Atish Dipankar University of Science and Technology.

References

Living people
Awami League politicians
11th Jatiya Sangsad members
Place of birth missing (living people)
People from Shariatpur District
1966 births
Atish Dipankar University of Science and Technology trustees